The Kingdom of Lamjung was a petty kingdom in the confederation of 24 states known as Chaubisi Rajya. King of Lamjung, Narahari Shah's young brother went on to establish the Gorkha Kingdom which later became present-day Nepal.

References 

Chaubisi Rajya
Lamjung
Lamjung
History of Nepal
Lamjung